The 2016 Carolina RailHawks season will be the club's tenth season of existence, and their sixth consecutive season in North American Soccer League, the second division of the American soccer pyramid.

Roster
As of July 22, 2016

Transfers

Winter

In:

Out:

Summer

In:

Out:

Friendlies

Competitions

NASL Spring season

Standings

Results summary

Results by round

Matches

NASL Fall season

Standings

Results

Results by round

Matches

U.S. Open Cup

Squad statistics

Appearances and goals

|-
|colspan="14"|Players away on loan:

|-
|colspan="14"|Players who left Carolina RailHawks during the season:

|}

Goal scorers

Disciplinary record

References

External links

2016
Carolina Railhawks Football Club
Carolina Railhawks Football Club
2016 in sports in North Carolina